Roscoe Mitchell (born August 3, 1940) is an American composer, jazz instrumentalist, and educator, known for being "a technically superb – if idiosyncratic – saxophonist". The Penguin Guide to Jazz described him as "one of the key figures" in avant-garde jazz; All About Jazz stated in 2004 that he had been "at the forefront of modern music" for more than 35 years. Critic Jon Pareles in The New York Times has mentioned that Mitchell "qualifies as an iconoclast". In addition to his own work as a bandleader, Mitchell is known for cofounding the Art Ensemble of Chicago and the Association for the Advancement of Creative Musicians (AACM).

History

Early life 
Mitchell was born in Chicago, Illinois, United States. He also grew up in the Chicago area, where he played saxophone and clarinet at around age twelve. His family was always involved in music with many different styles playing in the house when he was a child as well as having a secular music background. His brother, Norman, in particular was the one who introduced Mitchell to jazz. While attending Englewood High School in Chicago, he furthered his study of the clarinet. In the 1950s, he joined the United States Army, during which time he was stationed in Heidelberg, Germany and played in military parades with fellow saxophonists Albert Ayler and Rubin Cooper, the latter of whom, Mitchell commented, "took me under his wing and taught me a lot of stuff". He also studied under the first clarinetist of the Heidelberg Symphony while in Germany. Mitchell returned to the United States in the early 1960s, relocated to the Chicago area, and performed in a band with Wilson Junior College undergraduates Malachi Favors (bass), Joseph Jarman, Henry Threadgill, and Anthony Braxton (all saxophonists). Mitchell also studied with Muhal Richard Abrams and played in his band, the Muhal Richard Abrams' Experimental Band, starting in 1961.

AACM and the Art Ensemble of Chicago 
In 1965, Mitchell was one of the first members of the non-profit organization Association for the Advancement of Creative Musicians (AACM), along with Jodie Christian (piano), Steve McCall (drums), and Phil Cohran (composer). The following year Mitchell, Lester Bowie (trumpet), Kalaparusha Maurice McIntyre (tenor saxophone), Favors, Lester Lashley (trombone), and Alvin Fielder (drums), recorded their first studio album, Sound. The album was "a departure from the more extroverted work of the New York-based free jazz players", due in part to the band recording with "unorthodox devices" such as toys and bicycle horns.

From 1967, Mitchell, Bowie, Favors and, on occasion, Jarman performed as the Roscoe Mitchell Art Ensemble, then the Art Ensemble, and finally in 1969 were billed as the Art Ensemble of Chicago. The group included Phillip Wilson on drums for short span before he joined Paul Butterfield's band. The group lived and performed in Europe from 1969 to 1971, though they arrived without any percussionist after Wilson left. To fill the void, Mitchell commented that they "evolved into doing percussion ourselves". The band did eventually get a percussionist, Don Moye, who Mitchell had played with before and was living in Europe at that time. For performances, the band often wore brilliant costumes and painted their faces. The Art Ensemble of Chicago have been described as becoming "possibly the most highly acclaimed jazz band" in the 1970s and 1980s.

Creative Arts Collective and beyond 

Mitchell and the others returned to the States in 1971. After having been back in Chicago for three years, Mitchell then established the Creative Arts Collective (CAC) in 1974 that had a similar musical aesthetic to the AACM. The group was based in East Lansing, Michigan and frequently performed in auditoriums at Michigan State University. Mitchell also formed the Sound Ensemble in the early 1970s, an "outgrowth of the CAC" in his words, that consisted mainly of Mitchell, Hugh Ragin, Jaribu Shahid, Tani Tabbal, and Spencer Barefield.

In the 1990s, Mitchell started to experiment in classical music with such composers/artists such as Pauline Oliveros, Thomas Buckner, and Borah Bergman, the latter two of which formed a trio with Mitchell called Trio Space. Buckner was also part of another group with Mitchell and Gerald Oshita called "Space" in the late 1990s. He then conceived the Note Factory in 1992 with various old and new collaborators as another evolution of the Sound Ensemble.

He lived in the area of Madison, Wisconsin and performed with a re-assembled Art Ensemble of Chicago. In 1999, the band was hit hard with the death of Bowie, but Mitchell fought off the urge to recast his position in the group, stating simply "You can't do that" in an interview with Allaboutjazz.com editor-in-chief Fred Jung. The band continued on despite the loss.

Mitchell has made a point of working with younger musicians in various ensembles and combinations, many of whom were not yet born when the first Art Ensemble recordings were made.  Mainly from Chicago, these players include trumpeter Corey Wilkes, bassist Karl E. H. Seigfried, and drummer Isaiah Spencer.

In 2007, Mitchell was named Darius Milhaud Chair of Composition at Mills College in Oakland, California, where he currently lives. Mitchell was chosen by Jeff Mangum of Neutral Milk Hotel to perform at the All Tomorrow's Parties festival in March 2012 in Minehead, England.

Teaching 
Mitchell has taught at the University of Illinois, the University of Wisconsin–Madison, and the California Institute of the Arts. From 2007 to 2019 Mitchell has taught at Mills College in Oakland, California.

Awards and honors
The following are referenced from Mitchell's biography at the official AACM website.

Awards
 DownBeat magazine: Talent Deserving Wider Recognition, Best Jazz Group (Established, Art Ensemble of Chicago), Record of the Year (Nonaah)
 Madison Music Legend, Madison magazine
 Certificate of Appreciation, St. Louis Public Schools Role Model Experiences Program
 Certificate of Appreciation, Art Ensemble of Chicago (Smithsonian Institution)
 Honorary Citizen of Atlanta, Georgia
 International Jazz Critics Poll
 Jazz Personality of the Year, City of Madison, Wisconsin
 Image Award, National Association for the Advancement of Colored People
 Jazz Master, National Endowment for the Arts 
 Outstanding Service to Jazz Education Award, National Association of Jazz Educators

Grants
 Arts Midwest Jazz Masters
 Comnicut Foundation
 Dane County Cultural Affairs Commission Project Grant, Madison Committee for the Arts
 Foundation for Contemporary Arts Grants to Artists Award (1996)
 Institut de Recherche at Coordination Acoustique Musique, Paris, France
 Madison Festival of the Lakes Grant
 Meet the Composer, Cultural Series Grant, Center for International Performance and Exhibition, Chicago
 Michigan State University matching grant
 Minnesota Composer's Forum
 National Endowment for the Arts
 Wisconsin Arts Board

Discography

With Art Ensemble of Chicago

Solo albums and other ensembles
 Before There Was Sound (Nessa, 1965; 2011)
 Sound (Delmark, 1966)
 Solo Saxophone Concerts (Sackville, 1974)
 Roscoe Mitchell Quartet (Sackville, 1976)
 Nonaah (Nessa, 1976)
 Duets with Anthony Braxton (Sackville, 1977)
 L-R-G / The Maze / S II Examples (Nessa, 1978)
 Sketches from Bamboo (Moers Music, 1979)
 Snurdy McGurdy and Her Dancin' Shoes (Nessa, 1981)
 3 x 4 Eye (Black Saint, 1981)
 More Cutouts (Cecma, 1981)
 Roscoe Mitchell and the Sound and Space Ensembles (Black Saint, 1983)
 An Interesting Breakfast Conversation (1750 Arch, 1984)
 The Flow of Things (Black Saint, 1986)
 Live at the Muhle Hunziken (Cecma, 1986)
 Live at the Knitting Factory (Black Saint, 1987)
 Four Compositions (Lovely Music, 1987)
 Live in Detroit (Cecma, 1988)
 Songs in the Wind (Victo, 1991)
 After Fallen Leaves (Silkheart, 1992)
 Duets & Solos (Black Saint, 1993)
 This Dance Is for Steve McCall (Black Saint, 1993)
 The Italian Concert (with Borah Bergman) (Soul Note, 1994)
 Hey Donald (Delmark, 1995)
 First Meeting (Knitting Factory, 1995)
 Pilgrimage (Lovely Music, 1995)
 Sound Songs (Delmark, 1997)
 The Day and the Night (Dizim, 1997)
 Nine to Get Ready (ECM, 1999)
 In Walked Buckner (Delmark, 1999)
 8 O'Clock: Two Improvisations (Mutable Music, 2001)
 Song for My Sister (Pi, 2002)
 The Bad Guys (Around Jazz, 2003)
 Solo [3] (Mutable, 2004)
 First Look, Chicago Duos (Southport, 2005)
 Turn (RogueArt, 2005)
 No Side Effects (RogueArt, 2006)
 Composition/Improvisation Nos. 1, 2 & 3 with Evan Parker (ECM, 2007)
 Contact (RogueArt, 2007)
 Spectrum (Mutable, 2010)
 Far Side with The Note Factory (ECM, 2010)
 Numbers (RogueArt, 2011)
 Three Compositions with Nicole Mitchell's Black Earth Ensemble (RogueArt, 2012)
 Duets with Tyshawn Sorey and Special Guest Hugh Ragin (Wide Hive, 2013)
 Improvisations (Otoroku, 2013) with Tony Marsh and John Edwards
 Conversations I (Wide Hive Records, 2014) with Craig Taborn and Kikanju Baku
 Conversations II (Wide Hive Records, 2014) with Craig Taborn and Kikanju Baku
 In Pursuit of Magic (482 Music, 2014) with Mike Reed
 Angel City (RogueArt, 2014) Roscoe Mitchell Trio with James Fei & William Winant
 Celebrating Fred Anderson (Nessa, 2015)
 Four Ways (Nessa, 2017) with Yuganaut
 Bells for the South Side (ECM, 2017)
 Discussions (Wide Hive Records, 2017)
 Accelerated Projection (RogueArt, 2018) with Matthew Shipp
 Ride the Wind (Nessa, 2018)
 Roscoe Mitchell Orchestra Littlefield Concert Hall Mills College (Wide Hive Records, 2019)
 Flow States (ScienSonic, 2020) with Marshall Allen, Milford Graves, and Scott Robinson

As sideman
With Anthony Braxton
Creative Orchestra Music 1976 (Arista, 1976)
For Trio (Arista, 1978)

With Jodie Christian
Rain or Shine (Delmark, 1994)
Soul Fountain (Delmark, 1998)

With Jack DeJohnette
Made in Chicago (ECM, 2013 [2015]) with Muhal Richard Abrams, Larry Gray and Henry Threadgill

With Sunny Murray
Sunshine (BYG, 1969)

With Evan Parker
Boustrophedon (ECM, 2004)

With Matthew Shipp
2-Z (2.13.61, 1996)

With Alan Silva
Seasons (BYG, 1971)

With Wadada Leo Smith
Budding of a Rose (Moers Music, 1979)

References

External links
 All About Jazz: Roscoe Mitchell: In Search of the Super Musician Posted: 2004-01-08
 Roscoe Mitchell interview by Jason Gross (May 1998)
 Lovely Music Artist: Roscoe Mitchell
 Roscoe Mitchell Page at Wide Hive Records
 

1940 births
Living people
African-American saxophonists
Avant-garde jazz musicians
American jazz composers
American male jazz composers
American jazz saxophonists
American male saxophonists
American jazz oboists
Male oboists
Mills College faculty
Art Ensemble of Chicago members
Jazz musicians from Illinois
Musicians from Chicago
Pi Recordings artists
Delmark Records artists
Nessa Records artists
21st-century American saxophonists
21st-century American male musicians
Sackville Records artists
RogueArt artists
ECM Records artists
Black Saint/Soul Note artists
Moers Music artists
21st-century African-American musicians
20th-century African-American people